Kushkan may refer to:
 Kushkan, Razavi Khorasan (كوشكان - Kūshkān)
 Kushkan, Zanjan (كوشكن - Kūshkan)